Searchers 2.0 is a 2007 road film directed by Alex Cox. It stars Del Zamora and Ed Pansullo. Described by Cox as a "microfeature," it was shot on digital video in 10 days for a budget of $180,000. Lacking distribution, it featured a very limited theatrical run of one-night showings at various theaters throughout 2007 and 2008, followed by its premiere on BBC in the UK, and eventual DVD release in Japan and North America. The film marks Cox's return to the comedy genre, since Straight to Hell, 20 years prior.

Plot
The story follows two out of work actors, Mel and Fred. Mel works part-time as a day laborer. They learn that screenwriter Fritz Frobisher, who had violently abused the two actors with a whip during a childhood acting job, will be appearing at a screening of one of his films that will take place in Monument Valley. The two decide to travel from Los Angeles to the screening, but neither owns a car, so they convince Mel's daughter, Delilah, to drive them on their revenge journey.

Cast
 Del Zamora as Mel Torres
 Ed Pansullo as Fred Fletcher
 Leonard Maltin as Film critic
 Jaclyn Jonet as Delilah Torres
 Sy Richardson as Fritz Frobisher
 Zahn McClarnon as Rusty Frobisher
 Cy Carter as Director
 Andres Carranza as Mexican Guy
 Jason Norquist as Driver
 Roger Corman as Producer
 Brandon Carlos as Young Mel
 Steven Fierberg as Proprietor
 Alex Cox as Entrepreneur
 Esther Williams as Goulding's Employee #1
 Linda Litsui as Goulding's Employee #2
 Larry Holiday as Golfer #1
 Lorenz Holiday as Golfer #2
 Tim League as Roustabout #1
 Simon Tams as Cameraman
 Zack Carlson as Roustabout #2 (uncredited)

Production
Portions of the film were shot in the Coachella Valley, California.

References

Further reading
 Matthew Sorrento: "Alex Cox and the Hybrid Western". In: Stoddart, Scott, ed., The New Western. Jefferson, NC: McFarland, 2016.

External links
 
  

2007 films
Films directed by Alex Cox
Films shot in California
2000s English-language films
American road movies
2000s road movies
2000s American films